Janz is a given name and a surname. It may refer to:

People

Given name
Janž Tulščak (? – c. 1594), first name also spelled Ivan, Hans, last name also spelled Tulschak, Tulszhak, a.k.a. Feistenberger or Scherer), Slovene Protestant preacher and writer
Jan Janz Slop, or Jan Slob (1643–1727), Dutch Golden Age painter
Geoff Jansz or Jeff Janz (born 1958), Sri Lankan-born Australian chef and television presenter

Surname
Alicia Janz (born 1990), Australian rules footballer
B. B. Janz (1877–1964), minister of the Mennonite Brethren Church
Helmut Janz (1934-2000), German track and field athlete
Josie Janz-Dawson (born 1988), Australian netball player
Karin Büttner-Janz (born 1952), East German medical doctor and athlete who won world and Olympic gold medals in artistic gymnastics for East Germany
Paul Janz (born 1951), Canadian theologian, formerly a singer-songwriter of pop rock music in the mainstream and in contemporary Christian music
Robert Janz (born 1932), American artist
Thiele Janz (born 1957) Mathematician (QUE corporation)

Places
 Šentjanž (disambiguation), a number of municipalities in Slovenia

Other
 Janz, a German firearms manufacturer

See also
Jansz or Janszoon, a number of persons

References